Tetraclita rufotincta is a species of symmetrical sessile barnacle in the family Tetraclitidae.

References

rufotincta
Crustaceans described in 1916